Glen Echo is a town in Montgomery County, Maryland, United States, that was chartered in 1904. The population was 255 at the 2010 census.

History
Glen Echo derives its name from the name of the lots developed by Edward, and Edwin Baltzley, father of Louis E. Baltzley, and an inventor, before the town was chartered, and who came up with the name c. 1888. Their promotional booklet for the land development was titled "Glen Echo on the Potomac: The Washington Rhine".

The town is famous for its Chautauqua cultural events and its old amusement park, the famous Glen Echo Park, now a U.S. National Park.

Clara Barton, founder of the American Red Cross, lived in Glen Echo, a streetcar ride from her office, from 1897 until her death in 1912.

In the 1980s, Glen Echo designated its town bird as the Pileated Woodpecker; insect, Spicebush Swallowtail; tree, Eastern Sycamore; and wildflower, Heartleaf Aster.

Geography

Demographics

2010 census
As of the census of 2010, there were 255 people, 96 households, and 66 families living in the town. The racial makeup of the town was 92.5% White, 1.2% African American, 2.4% Asian, 1.6% from other races, and 2.4% from two or more races. Hispanic or Latino of any race were 3.9% of the population.

There were 96 households, of which 39.6% had children under the age of 18 living with them, 64.6% were married couples living together, 3.1% had a female householder with no husband present, 1.0% had a male householder with no wife present, and 31.3% were non-families. 26.0% of all households were made up of individuals, and 14.6% had someone living alone who was 65 years of age or older. The average household size was 2.66 and the average family size was 3.27.

The median age in the town was 42.4 years. 27.5% of residents were under the age of 18; 4.3% were between the ages of 18 and 24; 23.8% were from 25 to 44; 31.4% were from 45 to 64; and 12.9% were 65 years of age or older. The gender makeup of the town was 47.8% male and 52.2% female.

2000 census
As of the census of 2000, there were 242 people, 91 households, and 63 families living in the town. The racial makeup of the town was 95.87% White, 2.48% African American, 1.24% Asian, 0.41% from other races. Hispanic or Latino of any race were 1.65% of the population.

There were 91 households, out of which 39.6% had children under the age of 18 living with them, 63.7% were married couples living together, 5.5% had a female householder with no husband present, and 29.7% were non-families. 15.4% of all households were made up of individuals, and 6.6% had someone living alone who was 65 years of age or older. The average household size was 2.66 and the average family size was 3.00.

In the town, the population was spread out, with 24.8% under the age of 18, 2.9% from 18 to 24, 32.6% from 25 to 44, 32.2% from 45 to 64, and 7.4% who were 65 years of age or older. The median age was 39 years. For every 100 females, there were 108.6 males. For every 100 females age 18 and over, there were 93.6 males.

The median income for a household in the town was $122,409, and the median income for a family was $134,741. Males had a median income of $64,375 versus $76,784 for females. The per capita income for the town was $56,728. None of the families and 1.7% of the population were living below the poverty line.

Education
Glen Echo is served by Montgomery County Public Schools.

Schools that serve Glen Echo include:
 Bannockburn Elementary School
 Thomas W. Pyle Middle School
 Walt Whitman High School

Transportation

The most prominent roads serving Glen Echo directly are the Clara Barton Parkway and its spur, the Cabin John Parkway, which intersect at the west end of the town. Access to the residential and commercial properties in the town is via an interchange with MacArthur Boulevard just southeast of the town limits. MacArthur Boulevard intersects with most streets within the town, though it is not actually within the town limits. Maryland Route 188 and Maryland Route 614 also end at MacArthur Boulevard just beyond the town limits.

Notable people
Carol J. Barton (born 1954), noted American book artist and painter, runs the Glen Echo Mini Farm Stand
Clara Barton (1821-1912), founder of the American Red Cross, moved to, retired at, and died in Glen Echo.
Roger Tory Peterson (1908-1996), American naturalist, ornithologist, artist, educator, and pioneering conservationist. With his wife, Peterson moved to Glen Echo in 1945 after his military service.
Carolyn Reeder (1937-2012), Children's author and winner of the Scott O'Dell Award for Historical Fiction.

See also
Glen Echo Park, Maryland

References

External links

 
 Cook, Richard A. (1997). A History of  Glen Echo, Maryland.

1904 establishments in Maryland
Maryland populated places on the Potomac River
Populated places established in 1904
Towns in Maryland
Towns in Montgomery County, Maryland